Jose Panachippuram (born 24 August 1951 in Kottayam District, Kerala, India) is a noted short story writer, novelist and journalist in Malayalam.  He is working as the Senior associate editor of Malayala Manorama daily.  He won the Kerala Sahithya Academy Award in 2005 for the novel Kannadiyile Mazha. His essay Tharangangalil won the P. Kesavadev Literary Award in 2007.

Published books 
Dharavi
Snehapoorvam Panachi
Tharangamgalil
Alikhitham
Thiruvallakkum Chengannoorinumidayil Evideyo
Kannadiyile Mazha

References

Indian male short story writers
1951 births
Living people
Malayalam-language writers
Malayalam-language journalists
Malayalam short story writers
Malayalam novelists
People from Kottayam district
Recipients of the Kerala Sahitya Akademi Award
Writers from Kottayam
20th-century Indian short story writers
Journalists from Kerala
Indian male novelists
Indian male journalists
20th-century Indian novelists
20th-century Indian male writers